Emergent (formerly PDP++) is neural simulation software that is primarily intended for creating models of the brain and cognitive processes. The 3.x release of the software, which was known as PDP++, is featured in the textbook Computational Explorations in Cognitive Neuroscience.

Features 
Emergent features a modular design, based on the principles of object-oriented programming. It runs on Microsoft Windows, Darwin / macOS and Linux. C-Super-Script (variously, CSS and C^C), a built-in C++-like interpreted scripting language, allows access to virtually all simulator objects and can initiate all the same actions as the GUI, and more. Version 4 and upward features a full 3D environment for visualizations, based on Qt and Open Inventor. Robotics simulations are made possible by integration with the Open Dynamics Engine. A plugin system allows for expanding the software in many ways. Version 5 introduced parallel threading support, numerous speed improvements, a help browser featuring an interface to the project's Wiki and auto-generated documentation, undo and redo using diffs and a definable undo depth. In addition, 5.0.2 introduced a built-in plugin source code editor, and plugins can now be compiled from the main interface, enabling full development of plugins within Emergent.

Emergent also provides an implementation of Leabra which was developed by Randall C. O'Reilly in his PhD thesis.

See also 

David Rumelhart
Randall C. O'Reilly
James McClelland (psychologist)
Biologically inspired computing
Computational neuroscience
Leabra

Bibliography

References

Neural network software
Science software for macOS
Science software for Windows
Science software for Linux
Free science software
Software that uses Qt